The Curaçá River is a river of Bahia state in eastern Brazil. Juazeiro is in reality part of a twin city called Petrolina-Juazeiro and it lies on the São Francisco River and the Curaçá River.

See also
List of rivers of Bahia

References
Brazilian Ministry of Transport

Rivers of Bahia